Houari Boumédiène ( ; ALA-LC: Hawwārī Būmadyan; born Mohammed Ben Brahim Boukherouba; 23 August 1932 – 27 December 1978) was an Algerian politician and army colonel who served as Chairman of the Revolutionary Council of Algeria from 19 June 1965 until 12 December 1976 and thereafter as the second President of Algeria until his death in 1978.

Born in Guelma, he was educated at the Islamic Institute in Constantine. He joined the National Liberation Front in 1955 and adopted the nom de guerre Houari Boumediene. He received the rank of colonel and in 1960 became the commander of the military wing of the FLN.

President Ahmed Ben Bella appointed him Minister of Defense in 1961. He did not agree with Ben Bella's reforms, and later overthrew him in a bloodless coup in June 1965. He abolished the constitution and the parliament, and he himself was the leader of the 27-member Revolutionary Council, the new institution that governed the state. The members of the council were mostly from the army. Initially he did not have much influence, but after a group of military officers tried to overthrow him in 1967, he consolidated his power. The oil industry was nationalized in 1971. From the 1970s, a gradual restoration of parliamentarism and civil institutions in Algeria was initiated. This process ended with the adoption of the new constitution in 1976. The position of president was reinstated, and Boumediene took over.

Since 1978, Boumediene appeared less and less in public. He died on December 27, 1978, after an unsuccessful treatment for a rare disease, Waldenström's macroglobulinemia. He was succeeded as president by Chadli Bendjedid, as a compromise solution between left and right-oriented military officers.

Early life and War of Independence 

Not much is known about Boumédiène's early life. His place of birth variously appear as Guelma, the village of Clauzel near Guelma, or Héliopolis, and his date of birth as 16 August 1925, 23 August 1927, or in most sources as 1932. His father said in a 1965 interview that his date of birth was 23 August 1932. His birth name was Mohammed Ben Brahim Boukherouba, and his father was a penniless wheat-farmer and a strict Muslim who did not speak French. According to the Encyclopaedia of Islam, his family is Arabic speaking of Berber origins. He was educated at a Quranic school in Guelma until he was 14, then an Arabic secondary school in Constantine.

In 1952, when France was conscripting Algerians to fight in the Indochina War, Boumédiène went to Cairo, where he studied at the Al-Azhar University. It was there he first met Ahmed Ben Bella. He joined the National Liberation Front (FLN) in the Algerian War of Independence in 1955, adopting Houari Boumédiène as his nom-de-guerre (from Sidi Boumediène, the name of the patron saint of the city of Tlemcen in western Algeria, where he served as an officer during the war, and Sidi El Houari, the patron saint of nearby Oran). He reached the rank of colonel, then the highest rank in the FLN forces, and from 1960 he was chief of staff of the ALN, the FLN's military wing.

He was married to Anissa al-Mansali.

After independence 

In 1961, after its vote of self-determination, Algeria declared independence and the French announced it was independent. Boumédiène and Ahmed Ben Bella overthrew the provisional government of Benyoucef Benkhedda with support from the ALN in 1962. Boumédiène headed a powerful military faction within the government and was made defence minister by the Algerian president Ahmed Ben Bella, whose ascent to power he had assisted as chief of staff. Boumédiène was also appointed as Vice President of Algeria in September 1963. He grew increasingly distrustful of Ben Bella's erratic style of government and ideological puritanism, and in June 1965, Boumédiène seized power in a bloodless coup.

The country's constitution and political institutions were abolished, and he ruled through a Revolutionary Council of his own mostly military supporters. Many of them had been his companions during the war years, when he was based around the Moroccan border town of Oujda, which caused analysts to speak of the "Oujda Group". One prominent member of this circle was Boumédiène's long-time foreign minister, Abdelaziz Bouteflika, who served as Algeria's president from 1999 until 2019.

Initially, he was seen as potentially a weak leader, with no significant power base except inside the army, and it was not known to what extent he commanded the officer corps. He remained Algeria's undisputed leader until his death in 1978. No significant internal challenges emerged from inside the government after the 1967 coup attempt. After the coup, he insisted on collective rule.

Domestic policy 

Economically, Boumédiène turned away from Ben Bella's focus on rural Algeria and experiments in socialist cooperative businesses (l'autogestion). Instead, he opted for a more systematic and planned programme of state-driven industrialization. Algeria had virtually no advanced production at the time, but in 1971 Boumédiène nationalized the Algerian oil industry, increasing government revenue tremendously (and sparking intense protest from the French government). He then put the soaring oil and gas resources—enhanced by the oil price shock of 1973—into building heavy industry, hoping to make Algeria the Maghreb's industrial centre. His years in power were in fact marked by a reliable and consistent economic growth, but after his death, in the 1980s, the drop in oil prices and increasingly evident inefficiency of the country's state-run industries, prompted a change in policy towards gradual economical liberalization. Boumédiène imposed Arab socialism as the state ideology and declared Islam the state religion. He was a strong supporter of Arabization and was more assertive than Ben Bella in Arabizing Algeria, especially between 1970 and 1977, and declared 1971 the year of Arabization.

In the 1970s, along with the expansion of state industry and oil nationalization, Boumédiène declared a series of socialist revolutions, and strengthened the leftist aspect of his administration. A side-effect of this was the rapprochement with the hitherto suppressed remnants of the Algerian Communist Party (the PAGS), whose members were now co-opted into the government, where it gained some limited intellectual influence, although without formal legalization of their party. Algeria formally remained a single-party state under the FLN.

Political stability reigned, however, as attempts at challenging the state were generally nipped in the bud. As chairman of the Revolutionary Command Council, Boumédiène and his associates ruled by decree. During the 1970s, constitutional rule was gradually reinstated and civilian political institutions were restored and reorganized. Efforts were made to revive activity within the FLN, and state institutions were reestablished systematically, starting with local assemblies and moving up through regional assemblies to the national level, with the election of a parliament. The process culminated with the adoption of a constitution (1976) that laid down Algeria's political structure. This was preceded by a period of relatively open debate on the merits of the government-backed proposal, although the constitution itself was then adopted in a state-controlled referendum with no major changes. The constitution reintroduced the office of president, which Boumédiène entered after a single-candidate referendum in 1978.

At the time of his death, later that year, the political and constitutional order in Algeria was virtually entirely of FLN design. This structure remained largely unchanged until the late 1980s, when political pluralism was introduced and the FLN lost its role as dominant single party. (Many basic aspects of this system and the Boumédiène-era constitution are still in place.) However, throughout Boumédiène's era, the military remained the dominant force in the country's politics, and military influence permeated civilian institutions such as the FLN, parliament and government, undercutting the constitutionalization of the country's politics. Intense financial or political rivalries between military and political factions persisted, and was kept in check and prevented from destabilizing the government mainly by Boumédiène's overwhelming personal dominance of both the civilian and military sphere.

Algeria experienced significant economic and social development under his government. Between 1962 and 1982, the Algerian population increased from 10 to 20 million people and, massively rural before independence, 45% of the population was urbanized. Annual per capita income, which did not exceed 2,000 francs in 1962, exceeds 11,000 francs twenty years later, while the enrolment rate varies from 75 to 95% depending on the region, far from the 10% of French Algeria. However, it maintains a one-party system and the priority given to industrial development makes it neglect agriculture.

Foreign policy 
Boumédiène pursued a policy of non-alignment, maintaining good relations with both the communist bloc and the capitalist nations, and promoting third-world cooperation. In the United Nations, he called for a unity built on equal status for western and ex-colonial nations, and brought about by a socialist-style change in political and trade relations. He sought to build a powerful third world bloc through the Non-Aligned Movement, in which he became a prominent figure. He unconditionally supported freedom fighters, justice and equality seekers. He offered logistic assistance to anti-colonial movements and other militant groups across Africa and the Arab world, including the PLO, ANC, SWAPO and other nations.

Algeria remained strongly opposed to Israel. Algeria fought Israel in the Six-Day War in 1967 and Yom Kippur War in 1973. In response to the US support for Israel in the Six-Day War, Algeria severed diplomatic ties with USA and participated in the 1973 oil embargo after the US supported Israel in the Yom Kippur War. In response to Egypt's normalization of ties with Israel, Algeria along with other Arab countries condemned Anwar Sadat and severed ties with Egypt in 1977.

Algeria bought the majority of arms from the Soviet Union.

A significant regional event was his 1975 pledge of support for Western Saharan self-determination, admitting Sahrawi refugees and the Polisario Front national liberation movement to Algerian territory, after Morocco and Mauritania claimed control over the territory. This ended the possibility of mending relations with Morocco, already sour after the 1963 Sand War, although there had been a modest thaw in relations during his first time in power. The heightened Moroccan-Algerian rivalry and the still unsolved Western Sahara question became a defining feature of Algerian foreign policy ever since and remains so today.

Death 
In 1978, his appearances became increasingly rare. After lingering in a coma for 39 days, he died in Algiers of a rare blood disease, Waldenström's macroglobulinemia, following unsuccessful treatment in Moscow. Rumors about his being assassinated or poisoned have surfaced occasionally in Algerian politics, especially after two other participants of the 1975 Algiers Agreement events, The Shah and his Minister of Court Asadollah Alam, also died of the same rare disease. The death of Boumédiène left a power vacuum in Algeria which could not easily be filled; a series of military conclaves eventually agreed to sidestep the competing left- and right-wing contenders, and designate the highest-ranking military officer, Colonel Chadli Bendjedid, as a compromise selection.

See also 

Houari Boumediene Airport, an airport near Algiers named after him.
Houari Boumédienne District, a district in his native Guelma Province named after him.
El Mouradia Palace

Explanatory notes

Citations

General bibliography 
 Balta, Paul, and Claudine Roulleau, La Stratégie de Boumédiène, Simbad, 1978
 Francos, Ania, and Jean-Pierre Séréni, Un Algérien nommé Boumédiène, Stock, coll. Les Grands Leaders, 1976
 Minces, Juliette, L'Algérie de Boumediène, Presses de la Cité, 1978

External links 

  Le règne de Houari Boumediène, El Watan, 27 décembre 2008
  Video clip of a speech by Houari Boumédiène

1932 births
1978 deaths
Algerian nationalists
Algerian military personnel
Algerian Muslims
Algerian revolutionaries
Vice presidents of Algeria
Deaths from blood cancer
Members of the National Liberation Front (Algeria)
National Liberation Front (Algeria) politicians
People from Guelma Province
People from Guelma
Presidents of Algeria
Defense ministers of Algeria
Secretaries-General of the Non-Aligned Movement
Leaders who took power by coup
Articles containing video clips
Directors of intelligence agencies